Stone of Sisyphys is a 1981 video game developed by Chameleon Software for the Apple II, Atari 8-bit family, and TRS-80, and published by Adventure International.

Gameplay
Stone of Sisyphys is a solo dungeon adventure.

Reception
Russ Williams reviewed Stone of Sisyphys in The Space Gamer No. 49. Williams commented that "I would say this is a good program and a reasonable game, but consider your financial situation before getting it."

References

External links
Stone of Sisyphys at Atari Mania
Review in Page 6
Review in Publications International's Personal Computers And Games

1981 video games
Adventure International games
Apple II games
Atari 8-bit family games
Dungeon crawler video games
TRS-80 games
Video games developed in the United States